Che with diaeresis (Ӵ ӵ; italics: Ӵ ӵ) is a letter of the Cyrillic script. Its form is derived from the Cyrillic letter Che (Ч ч Ч ч).

It is the thirtieth letter of this alphabet.

Computing codes

See also
Cyrillic characters in Unicode

References
 Its form is derived from the Cyrillic letter Che (ЧX ч ЧX ч).

Cyrillic letters with diacritics
Letters with diaeresis